Diabolical Dynamics was the 2001 game for the FIRST Robotics Competition.

Field

The playing field is a carpeted, rectangular area. Around the perimeter of the field are two stations for human players, who work with remote controlled robots on the field to score points. At the start of each match, the alliance station contains twenty small balls. An additional twenty small balls and four large balls are located at the far end of the playing field.

Robots

Scoring
Each match is a maximum of two minutes long.  Alliances can end the match at any time. Alliances score one point for each small ball in the goal, ten points for each large ball in the goal, ten points for each robot in the End Zone, and ten points if the stretcher is in the End Zone. The alliance doubles its score for each goal that is on the bridge if the bridge is balanced, and multiplies its score by a factor of up to three by ending the match before the two-minute time limit. Each team receives the alliance score. A team multiplies its score by 1.1 if its large ball is on top of a goal. Scores are rounded up to the nearest whole point after applying all multipliers.

Reception
While most participants did not like the lack of "red versus blue" competition within matches, others praised the game for its inventiveness and emphasis on cooperation. A few consider it one of the best FIRST games designed.

Events
The following regional events were held in 2001:
 Kennedy Space Center Southeast Regional - Kennedy Space Center, Florida
 UTC New England Regional - Meadows Music Theater, Hartford, Connecticut
 SBPLI Long Island Regional - Suffolk County Community College, Long Island, New York
 NASA Langley/VCU/School of Engineering FIRST Robotics Competition - Virginia Commonwealth University, Richmond, Virginia
 West Michigan Regional - Grand Rapids Community college, Grand Rapids, Michigan
 Johnson & Johnson Mid-Atlantic Regional - Rutgers University, New Brunswick, New Jersey
 Lone Star Regional - Reliant Arena, Houston, Texas
 New York City FIRST! Regional - Columbia University, New York City
 Southern California Regional - Los Angeles Memorial Sports Arena, Los Angeles, California
 Great Lakes Regional - Eastern Michigan University, Ypsilanti, Michigan
 Motorola Midwest Regional - Northwestern University, Evanston, Illinois
 Philadelphia Alliance Regional - Drexel University, Philadelphia, Pennsylvania
 Silicon Valley Regional - San Jose State University, San Jose, California

The national championship was held at Epcot Center, Disney World, Orlando, Florida.

References

External links

2001 in robotics
FIRST Robotics Competition games